The 8th Filmfare Awards were held in Bombay to honor the best films in Hindi cinema in 1961. 

K. Asif's magnum opus Mughal-e-Azam led the ceremony with 11 nominations, followed by Chaudhvin Ka Chand with 6 nominations and Parakh with 5 nominations.

Chaudhvin Ka Chand, Mughal-e-Azam and Parakh won 3 awards each, thus becoming the most-awarded films at the ceremony.

Mughal-e-Azam, considered one of the greatest and most successful films of Bollywood, was expected to steam-roll the competition, controversially went home with just 3 wins out of its 11 nominations, including Best Film, but missed out on Best Director (for K. Asif), Best Lyricist (for Shakeel Badayuni for "Pyar Kiya To Darna Kiya"), Best Playback Singer (for Lata Mangeshkar for "Pyar Kiya To Darna Kiya") and all the 4 acting categories. Another glaring upset was Naushad's loss for Best Music Director for Mughal-e-Azam's epic soundtrack to Shankar-Jaikishan for Dil Apna Aur Preet Parai.

Dilip Kumar received dual nominations for Best Actor for his performances in Kohinoor and Mughal-e-Azam, winning for the former.

Madhubala received her first and only nomination for Best Actress for her performance as Anarkali in Mughal-e-Azam, which is considered to be amongst the greatest acting performances of Indian Cinema.

Main Awards

Technical Awards

Multiple nominations and wins

The following films received multiple awards and nominations.

See also
 9th Filmfare Awards
 7th Filmfare Awards
 Filmfare Awards

References

External links
 Winner and nomination of 9th Filmfare Awards at Internet Movie Database

Filmfare Awards
Filmfare
1961 in Indian cinema